Hugo Rautapää  (28 February 1874 - 9 July 1922) was a Finnish politician. He was a member of the Senate of Finland.

1874 births
1922 deaths
People from Hämeenlinna
People from Häme Province (Grand Duchy of Finland)
Finnish Party politicians
Finnish senators
Members of the Parliament of Finland (1910–11)
Members of the Parliament of Finland (1911–13)